Melea is a sub-prefecture of Kanem Region in Chad.

References 

Populated places in Chad